Acalolepta sulcicollis is a species of beetle in the family Cerambycidae. It was described by Gressitt in 1952. It is known from the Solomon Islands.

References

Acalolepta
Beetles described in 1952